Canthigaster jactator is a member of the pufferfish family that is endemic to the Hawaiian islands. It occasionally makes its way into the aquarium trade.

References

jactator
Fish of Hawaii
Endemic fauna of Hawaii
Fish described in 1901
Taxa named by Oliver Peebles Jenkins